Nikos Babaniotis (Greek: Νίκος Μπαμπανιώτης; born 28 June 1989) is a Greek footballer who plays for Acharnaikos F.C. as a goalkeeper .

International caps
Babaniotis has been capped with the Greece national under-19 football team.  He was a starter in all of Greece's games during the 2008 UEFA European Under-19 Football Championship, forcing Liverpool F.C. keeper Dean Bouzanis, who had been expected to start, to the bench.  In 2009, he was called up to the Greece national under-21 football team, by coach Nikos Nioplias.

References 

1989 births
Living people
Association football goalkeepers
Panetolikos F.C. players
PAS Giannina F.C. players
Footballers from Athens
Greek footballers